$O$ is the debut album by South African rap-rave group Die Antwoord. The album was initially a widely circulated internet-only release, and made available to stream for free on the band's website prior to Interscope Records signing the band. The song "Wat Pomp?" had a music video released on 6 June 2009, followed by "Enter the Ninja" (a track with previous exposure as a viral video on YouTube and other video-hosting services), which received an official release on 9 August 2010. "Fish Paste" and "Beat Boy" have also been released as promotional singles. "Enter the Ninja" debuted at #37 in the UK Music Charts on 19 September 2010.

Following the group's signing to Interscope in the US, it was announced that $O$ would be re-released in physical format with a different track listing. Diplo produced one of the new tracks on the re-release, "Evil Boy", for which a promotional video was made available on 6 October 2010. The US iTunes digital release includes the previously hidden track "$O$" separately, a bonus track "Wat Pomp?" and an alternate version of "Evil Boy" titled as "Evil Boy (F**k You In The Face Mix)" not present on US physical release.

In an interview Ninja mentioned that he considered the album to be the first in a five-album plan.

Track listings

Charts

References

Die Antwoord albums
2010 debut albums
Interscope Records albums
Cherrytree Records albums